Como dice el dicho (translation: As the saying goes) is a Mexican anthology drama series produced by Genoveva Martínez for Televisa. The series premiered on February 1, 2011, on Las Estrellas, and is currently airing its eleventh season.

The series covers a variety of stories in which a proverb (usually of Mexican origin) is selected for each episode and applied to real-life situations such as family violence, economic crisis, personal growth, the dignity of women, homosexuality, and drug addiction, among others.

Plot
The series is set in present-day Mexico City, mostly at a café named "Café El Dicho" owned by Don Tomás, who is helped by his granddaughter Isabel and his employees. Episodes usually center around the customers who, most of the time, are dealing with a problem. Throughout the episode a proverb is written in one of the white walls of the café, either by Don Tomás, one of his employees, or by a customer. The saying that is written usually describes the situation of what is happening in the particular moment it is written.

Production

Filming
Unlike many Televisa productions, Como dice el dicho is filmed on location in various parts of Mexico City. Six episodes are shot per week; two episodes are filmed simultaneously. The coffee shop scenes in Season 1 and the first episodes of Season 2 were filmed in the colonia Condesa in the borough of Cuauhtémoc. Since Season 2, coffee shop scenes have been filmed in the colonia Anzures in the borough of Miguel Hidalgo. The crew usually films at the coffee shop once or twice a week. The first two episodes of the fourth season were filmed in Zacatlán, Puebla, which was the first time the series filmed episodes outside of Mexico City. The first two episodes of the fifth season were filmed in ultra-high-definition 4K resolution.

Music
The series' original theme song is called "Como dice el dicho". It is performed by Mexican singer Mané de la Parra in Seasons 1 and 3. The same theme song is used for Season 2 but is performed by singer Jass Reyes. For season 4 a new song performed by Marco Di Mauro was used as the show's theme; this song is also called "Como dice el dicho". For seasons 5 and 6 the original theme song returned and was performed by Mané de la Parra and Margarita Vargas. For season 7, the song is performed by de la Parra and the Mexican band La Original Banda El Limón. In season 8 the song is performed by de la Parra and Mario Bautista.

Cast

Characters

Awards and nominations

Premios TVyNovelas

References

External links

Location of Coffee Shop on Google Street View

Mexican telenovelas
Televisa telenovelas
Las Estrellas original programming
2011 Mexican television series debuts
Television series by Televisa
2010s LGBT-related drama television series
Mexican LGBT-related television shows
Mexican anthology television series
Television shows set in Mexico City